Richland School District may refer to:

 Richland School District (Cambria County, Pennsylvania), Pennsylvania, United States
 Richland School District (Washington), Washington, United States
 Richland School District (Wisconsin), Wisconsin, United States
 Richland County School District One, South Carolina, United States
 Richland County School District Two, South Carolina, United States
 Lexington & Richland County School District Five, South Carolina, United States
 Richland School District 88A, Illinois, United States